Mallik or Mallick is an Indian and Bangladeshi surname that may refer to
A R Mallick (1918–1997), Bangladeshi historian and educationist
Abhilash Mallick (born 1991), Indian cricketer
Amaal Mallik, Indian music composer and playback singer 
 Anmoll Mallik, Indian playback singer and songwriter
Anne-Marie Mallik (born 1952), English actress
Azharuddin Mallick, Indian football player
Bani K Mallick, Indian statistician
Basanta Kumar Mallik (1879–1958), Bengali philosopher
Donald L. Mallick (born 1930), American pilot 
Heather Mallick (born 1959), Canadian columnist, author and lecturer
Indumadhab Mallick (1869–1917), Indian polymath 
Jyotipriya Mallick, Indian politician 
Koel Mullick (born 1982), Indian film actress
Koel Mallick (born 1981),Belurmath Kolkata's philanthropist and "satyanneshi" passion detective and photographer 
Kumarendra Mallick (born 1942), Indian geophysicist and poet 
 Matiur Rahman Mallik, Bangladeshi national activist
Mohammed Adam Mallik (died 2013), Indian politician
Muhammad Naqi Mallick (born 1928), Pakistani cyclist
Nagma Mallick, Indian diplomat
Netar Mallick (born 1935), English nephrologist
 Nodu Mallik, Indian sitar maker
Pravesh Mallick (born 1980), Indian composer, songwriter and playback singer
Ram Chatur Mallick (1902–1990), Indian classical musician
Ranjit Mallick (born 1944), Indian film actor and blogger 
 Ranjit Mallik (born 1944), Bengali film actor
Rasik Krishna Mallick (1810–1858), Indian journalist, editor and educationist 
Roop Mallik, Indian biophysicist 
Sadya Afreen Mallick, Bangladeshi singer and journalist
Samad Ali Mallick, Indian football player
Shirala Mallick, Pakistani politician 
Subodh Chandra Mallik (1879–1920), Bengali industrialist and philanthropist 
Syed Ibrahim Mallick Baya, 14th century Indian governor

See also
Mullick